Karl Lutz (born 23 February 1914, date of death unknown) was an Austrian heavyweight boxer who competed in the 1936 Summer Olympics.

Lutz selected after winning the Austrian National Championship and was eliminated in the second round of the heavyweight class after losing his fight to Ernest Toussaint of Luxembourg.

References

External links
Sports Reference Profile

1914 births
Year of death missing
Heavyweight boxers
Olympic boxers of Austria
Boxers at the 1936 Summer Olympics
Austrian male boxers
20th-century Austrian people